Mont-de-Huisnes German war cemetery is a military war grave mausoleum, located 1 km north of Huisnes-sur-Mer and a few kilometres southwest of Avranches, France. It presently contains in nearly 12,000 burials of German military personnel of World War II, plus some women and children. It is maintained and managed by the German War Graves Commission.

History
The cemetery, situated at the top of a 30m hill at Mont-de-Huisnes, is the only German crypt construction in France. In 1961, the Reburial Service of the German War Graves Commission interred German soldiers from numerous small graveyards and field graves to the mausoleum; including those previously buried in the French departments of Morbihan, Ille-et-Vilaine, Mayenne, Sarthe, Loir-et-Cher, Indre-et-Loire and Vienne as well as from the Channel Islands of Guernsey, Jersey, Alderney and Sark. The only exception was that the German graves located in the graveyard of Fort-George in Saint Peter Port on the island of Guernsey were not moved.

The circular crypt is 47m in diameter and constructed on two floors. Within the inner side of the crypt are 34 crypt rooms on each level containing 180 burials. The floors are connected by gangways and stairs. A large cross dominates the central grassed area. Opposite the entrance, steps lead onto up a natural terrace from which Mont-Saint-Michel can be viewed.

The names of the interred are placed on bronze tablets affixed to the walls of each crypt. The memorial was inaugurated on 14 September 1963.

Photographs

Personal fates
The majority of the fallen in the graveyard date from the American advance during Operation Cobra and the subsequent American breakthrough at Avranches in July and August 1944.

Volunteer maintenance
Unlike the American and Commonwealth War Graves Commissions, the German Commission is entirely voluntary and relies on gifts and collections to further its work. During the summer months one may see international school children tending the graves. They volunteer to work with the Volksbund during their school holidays and visit American and German war cemeteries, memorials, sites of the invasion and take part in the memorial ceremony with veterans and the mayor of La Cambe.

See also 
 List of military cemeteries in Normandy

References

External links
 
 Huisne German Ossuaire (Deutsche Kriegsgräberstätte Mont-de-Huisnes)
 Website of Volksbund Deutsche Kriegsgräberfürsorge and the Deutsche Kriegsgräberstätte Mont-de-Huisnes (de)
 Deutsche Kriegsgräberstätte Mont-de-Huisnes (Mont d’Huisnes) (fr, de)

German War Graves Commission
World War II cemeteries in France
World War II memorials in France
1961 establishments in France
Cemeteries in Normandy